The Journal of Developing Societies is a refereed international journal on development and social change not only in 'developing' countries but also the 'developed' societies of the world. It provides an interdisciplinary forum for the publication of theoretical perspectives, research findings, case studies, policy analyses and normative critiques on the issues, problems and policies of both mainstream and alternative approaches to development.

The journal is a member of the Committee on Publication Ethics (COPE).

Abstracting and indexing 
The journal is abstracted and indexed in:
 ProQuest: International Bibliography of the Social Sciences (IBSS)
 SCOPUS
 Research Papers in Economics (RePEc)
 DeepDyve
 Portico
 Dutch-KB
 Pro-Quest-RSP
 EBSCO
 OCLC
 Ohio
 ICI
 ProQuest-Illustrata
 EBSCO: Australia/New Zealand Reference Centre
 Sociological Abstracts - ProQuest
 Worldwide Political Science Abstracts - ProQuest
 Thomson Reuters: Emerging Sources Citation Index (ESCI)
 J-Gate

External links 
 Official website
 Homepage

References 

 COPE

SAGE Publishing academic journals
Publications established in 2008
Development studies journals